The 1897 Newfoundland general election was held on 28 October 1897 to elect members of the 18th General Assembly of Newfoundland in Newfoundland Colony. The Tory Party led by James Spearman Winter formed the government. On February 15, 1900, the government was defeated following a vote on a motion of no confidence which was supported by the Liberals and several Tories.

Results by party

Elected members

 Bay de Verde
 Abraham Kean Tory
 W. P. Rogerson Tory
 Bonavista Bay
 Darius Blandford Tory
 John Cowan Tory
 John A. Robinson Tory
 Alfred B. Morine Tory, elected later
 Burgeo-LaPoile
 Henry Y. Mott Tory (speaker)
 Burin
 James S. Winter Tory
 John E. Lake Tory
 Carbonear
 William Duff Liberal
 Ferryland
 Michael P. Cashin Liberal
 George Shea Tory
 Fogo
 Thomas C. Duder Tory
 Fortune Bay
 H. R. Hayward Tory
 Charles Way Liberal, elected in 1899 
 Harbour Grace
 William H. Horwood Liberal
 Eli Dawe Liberal
 W. A. Oke Liberal
 Harbour Main
 J. J. St. John Tory
 William Woodford Tory
 Placentia and St. Mary's
 William J. S. Donnelly Tory
 Richard T. McGrath Liberal, elected in 1899
 Rhodie Callahan Tory
 Michael H. Carty Tory
 Port de Grave
 Charles Dawe Tory
 St. Barbe
 Albert Bradshaw Tory
 St. George's
 Michael P. Gibbs Tory
 St. John's East
 John P. Fox Liberal
 Thomas J. Murphy Liberal
 Lawrence Furlong Liberal
 St. John's West
 Edward P. Morris Liberal
 James C. Tessier Liberal
 James J. Callanan Liberal
 Trinity Bay
 Robert S. Bremner Tory
 Robert Watson Tory
 L. March Tory
 John A. Robinson Tory, elected in 1898
 Twillingate
 Robert Bond Liberal
 Donald Browning Liberal
 Alan Goodridge Tory

References 
 

1897
1897 elections in North America
1897 elections in Canada
Pre-Confederation Newfoundland
1897 in Newfoundland
October 1897 events